The 2000 Salt Lake County Council election was held on Tuesday, November 7, 2000, to elect the first members of the newly formed Salt Lake County Council. The election coincided with other elections, such as county mayor, presidential and governor.

Utah Code (Title 17, Chapter 52a, Part 2) allows counties in the state to choose one of four forms of county government:
 Standard three-member full-time commission,
 Expanded five- or seven-member full-time commission,
 Three-, five-, seven- or nine-member part-time council with a full-time appointed manager,
 or a three-, five-, seven- or nine-member part-time council with a full-time elected mayor.

Like most counties in Utah, Salt Lake County was originally governed by a basic three-member commission. However, during the 1998 election cycle, county voters approved the change in form of county government to a nine-member council with an elected county mayor.

Republicans dominated the election, winning six out of nine council seats in the Republican-leaning large urban county.

Election results 

The Salt Lake County council consists of nine seats: three alphabetical districts are at-large and elected to six-year terms, while six numerical districts are sectioned into separate districts and elected to four year terms. However, since the council was newly formed and would take office in January 2001, in this election, all council seats were elected.

At-large seat A

At-large seat B

At-large seat C

District 1

District 2

District 3

District 4

District 5

District 6

Primary 

A Democratic primary was held on June 27, 2000.

General

References

2000 Utah elections
2000 United States local elections
2000 in Utah
2000s in Salt Lake City